Thankamany is a village at Idukki district, in Kerala state, India. There is a small town associated with this village.  In regional language thankamany is a name of a lady.  It is a belief that an older jungle king Thopran gave dowry as land for his three daughters Thankamony, Kamashi, and Neeli.  The place got for Thankamony is now known as Thankamony (place name), other nearby places are also known as Kamashi and Neelivayal (means land of Neeli).  Thankamany town is located in a valley of three small hills Thamprankunnu, Kattadikavala and Kurishupara respectively. One of the interesting thing is that, even though Kamashi is a different place, the panchayath of thankamany is called Kamashy panchayath and the office is situated in the middle of thankamany town.Sometimes in official documents thankamony is also written as thankamony. Nearest towns are Kattappana and Nedumkandam.

Demographics
As of 2011 Census, Thankamony had a population of 24,389 with 12,189 males and 12,200 females. In Thankamony, 10.5% of the population was under 6 years of age. Thankamony had an average literacy of 97.85% higher than the state average of 94%: male literacy was 97.7% and female literacy was 96%.

People 
The people of Thankamany speak the Malayalam language. Most of the people are involved in agriculture and are generally interested in the plantation of spices. Being a hilly area, the climate is suitable for pepper, cardamom, tea and coffee cultivation.

Most of the vegetables are exported from here to Ernakulam/Cochin (the nearest big town). This small village gives major production of vegetables. Thankamany is situated in Kamakshy Panchayath and in Thankamany Village.

Religion
Almost 90% of people are Roman Catholic Syrian Christian (R.C.S.C), most of them are migrated from Palai (in Kottayam district) before two generation or less than that.  Rest of the people are Hindus including Ezhavas and Nair. Brahmins and Muslims are not present here. People are in good communal harmony.

Institutions 

Being a Christian majority area, the St. Thomas Forane church situated at the heart of Thankamany town. It runs the St. Thomas H.S.S, which is the only school having a higher secondary status in and around of Thankamany.  Many small educational institutions like Vimala Neursery school are also situated here. In addition to that in the heart of Thankamany town a Nair temple is situated. Thankamany Co-Operative hospital is the main hospital here. A police station is also present here. Thankamany village office is also situated at the heart of Thankamany which is near to police station. Thankamany service Co-operative bank,UBI and Kerala Bank(IDCB) also present in Thankamany.There is also a Fuel Pump is situated in Thankamany

References

External links

Official Idukki District website

Villages in Idukki district